Studach is a surname. Notable people with the surname include: 

Eugen Studach (1907–?), Swiss rower 
Martin Studach (1944–2007), Swiss rower